Baiju Prafulkumar Bhatt (born 1984/1985) is an American entrepreneur of Indian descent. He is the chief creative officer and co-founder, along with Vladimir Tenev, of Robinhood, a US-based financial services company.

Early life
Baiju Prafulkumar Bhatt, the son of Indian immigrants, grew up in Poquoson, Virginia. He earned a bachelor's degree in physics from Stanford University where he also completed a master's degree in mathematics in 2008. He and Tenev met during Bhatt's time at Stanford.

Career
In 2013, Bhatt co-founded the trading platform Robinhood with Tenev. The idea stemmed from witnessing the issues in the financial industry during the 2011 protests of Occupy Wall Street. In 2015, Robinhood launched a mobile app.

Following a funding round in May 2018 which increased Robinhood's valuation to $6 billion, Bhatt and Tenev became billionaires.

As of August 2021, Forbes has estimated his net worth at US$2.4 billion.

Awards and recognition
Bhatt spoke at Disrupt SF 2018 on investing where he announced plans to launch an IPO for Robinhood in 2019. Bhatt made the Goldhouse 100 most impactful Asians in 2021. Bhatt appeared in a Fast Company list, "Most Creative People", in 2017, and a Forbes "30 Under 30" list in 2016.

Personal life
Bhatt is married, with one child, and lives in Palo Alto, California.

References

Living people
American company founders
American billionaires
Stanford University alumni
1980s births
Robinhood (company)
American people of Indian descent
21st-century American businesspeople
People from Poquoson, Virginia